Yoffie is a surname. Notable people with the surname include: 

David B. Yoffie, American academic
Eric Yoffie (born 1947), American rabbi
Leah Rachel Yoffie (1883–1956), American writer, educator, and folklorist

See also
Joffe
Jaffe family